Let's Be Ritzy is a 1934 American pre-Code comedy film directed by Edward Ludwig and written by Harry Sauber and Earle Snell. The film stars Lew Ayres, Patricia Ellis, Isabel Jewell, Frank McHugh, Berton Churchill and Robert McWade. The film was released on May 1, 1934, by Universal Pictures.

Plot

Cast 
Lew Ayres as Jimmy Sterling
Patricia Ellis as Ruth Sterling
Isabel Jewell as Betty
Frank McHugh as Bill Damroy Robert
Berton Churchill as R.M. Pembrook
Robert McWade as Splevin
Hedda Hopper as Mrs. Burton
Addison Richards as Lt. Spaulding
Clay Clement as Mr. Hildreth
Adrian Morris as Henry Robert
Betty Lawford as Mrs. Pembrook
Lois January as Stenographer
Craig Reynolds as Clerk 
Jimmy Scott as Clerk
Dean Benton as Clerk
Boothe Howard as Cop
Barry Norton as Rogers

References

External links 
 

1934 films
1930s English-language films
American comedy films
1934 comedy films
Universal Pictures films
Films directed by Edward Ludwig
American black-and-white films
Films scored by Edward Ward (composer)
1930s American films